Bobby Johnstone (13 September 1918 – 13 May 2007) was a Scottish footballer, who played as a wing half in the Football League for Tranmere Rovers.

References

External links

Tranmere Rovers F.C. players
Association football wing halves
Raith Rovers F.C. players
English Football League players
1918 births
2007 deaths
Scottish footballers
People from Cleland, North Lanarkshire
Footballers from North Lanarkshire